St. Francis High School is a school in the Central Indian District of Amravati, providing both language and science education for primary and high school level students. The school was founded by Kamalpushp Chauhan and his wife, Raj K. Chauhan in 1991.  Later, it expanded into the city of Bhubaneswar, Orissa with five school branches.  

High schools and secondary schools in Maharashtra
Education in Amravati